[[Image:De revolutionibus orbium coelestium.jpg|thumb|De revolutionibus orbium coelestium by Nicolaus Copernicus, title page of 2nd edition of 1566, Basilea, Ex Officina Henricpetrina]]

Henricus Petrus (1508–1579) and his son Sebastian Henric Petri (1546, Basel – 1627, Basel) headed the printer shop of Basel (Basilea in Latin), called Officina Henricpetrina.

Among their best known works, both of 1566, the second edition of De revolutionibus orbium coelestium by Nicolaus Copernicus, first published in 1543 in Nuremberg by Johannes Petreius, and of Narratio Prima by Georg Joachim Rheticus, published in 1540 in Danzig (Gdańsk) by Franz Rhode.

 Works 

Liber pantegni, Opera omnia ysaac. Ed. Andreas Turinus. Lugduni 1515; Constantini opera. Apud Henricus Petrus. Basileae 1536/39.
The Cosmographia' by Sebastian Münster (1488–1552) from 1544 was the earliest German description of the world.
Daniel Santbech, Problematum astronomicorum et geometricorum sectiones septem'', published 1561 in Basel by Henrich Petri and Petrus Perna.

External links
Polybiblio: Regiomontanus, Johannes/Santbech, Daniel, ed. De Triangulis Planis et Sphaericis libri quinque. Basel Henrich Petri & Petrus Perna 1561

German printers
Swiss book publishers (people)
People from Basel-Stadt
16th-century Swiss people
1508 births
1579 deaths